Love and the Russian Winter is the seventh studio album by British pop and soul group Simply Red, released on 2 November 1999. It marks a distinct change from the band's preceding albums, featuring a more computer-generated sound. The album was released mainly due to pressure from their record label to fulfil their contract. It features a cover version of "Ain't That a Lot of Love", written by Willia Dean Parker and Homer Banks.

Track listing
All tracks written by Mick Hucknall, except where noted. All tracks produced by Andy Wright, Gota Yashiki and Mick Hucknall. Additional production on "Your Eyes" by Merv Pearson.

"The Spirit of Life" – 4:42
"Ain't That a Lot of Love" (Willia Dean Parker, Homer Banks) – 3:56
"Your Eyes" – 4:15
"The Sky Is a Gypsy" – 4:33
"Back into the Universe" – 3:48
"Words for Girlfriends" – 5:07
"Thank You" – 4:01
"Man Made the Gun" – 4:58
"Close to You" – 4:33
"More Than a Dream" – 3:52
"Wave the Old World Goodbye" – 3:46
Japan Edition
"The Spirit of Life" – 4:42
"Ain't That a Lot of Love" – 3:56
"Your Eyes" – 4:15
"The Sky Is a Gypsy" – 4:33
"Back into the Universe" – 3:48
"Words for Girlfriends" – 5:07
"Thank You" – 4:01
"Man Made the Gun" – 4:58
"Close to You" – 4:33
"Come on in My Kitchen" (Bonus track)
"More Than a Dream" – 3:52
"Wave the Old World Goodbye" – 3:46

2008 Special Edition bonus tracks
 "Ain't That a Lot of Love" (Phats & Small Mutant Disco Vocal Mix) – 6:08
 "Ain't That a Lot of Love" (Club 69 Underground Dub Mx) – 6:36 
 "Your Eyes" (Mousse T Acoustic) – 3:54
 "Your Eyes" (Ignorants Remix) – 4:41 
 "Your Eyes" (Jimmy Gomez Funky Mix) – 7:06

Personnel 
Simply Red
 Mick Hucknall – lead vocals, backing vocals, horn arrangements 
 Tim Vine – keyboards, bass 
 Andy Wright – keyboards, programming, bass 
 Mark Jaimes – guitars 
 Gota Yashiki – bass, drums, programming 
 Ian Kirkham – saxophones
 John Johnson – trombone
 Kevin Robinson – trumpet
 Sarah Brown – backing vocals
 Dee Johnson – backing vocals

Additional musicians
 Dominic "Dom T." Thrup – keyboards 
 Aiden Love – keyboards 
 Phillipe Manjard – keyboards 
 James Wiltshire – keyboards, programming 
 Ned Douglas – programming
 Merv Pearson – programming (3)
 Greg Bone – guitars
 Kenji Suzuki – guitars
 Wayne Stobbart –bass 
 Geoff Holroyde – drums
 Chris De Margary – saxophones, flute

Production 
 AGM – producers
 Merv Pearson – additional production (3)
 Alistair Clay – recording  
 Alan Douglas – recording 
 John Lee – recording
 Mak Togashi – recording, assistant engineer 
 Matt White – recording, assistant engineer 
 James Wiltshire – recording
 Emily Cracknell – assistant engineer
 Andy Saunders – assistant engineer 
 Matt Tait – assistant engineer 
 Josh T – assistant engineer 
 Kevin Metcalfe – mastering 
 Peacock – artwork, photographic treatment
 Mick Hucknall – original artwork concept 
 Rick Guest – band photography 
 Idea – photographic treatment
 So What Media & Management, Inc. – management (USA)
 Silent Way, Ltd. – management (worldwide)

Studios
 Recorded at Westpoint Recording Studios, Metropolis Studios and The Town House (London, UK).
 Mastered at The Soundmasters (London, UK).

Charts

Weekly charts

Year-end charts

Certifications

References

Simply Red albums
1999 albums
East West Records albums